Labandeira is a Portuguese surname, it means Wagtail. Notable people with the surname include:

Facundo Labandeira (born 1996), Uruguayan footballer 
Josh Labandeira (born 1979), American baseball player
Julio Labandeira (born 1949), Argentine sailor

See also
Labande

Portuguese-language surnames